The plant Tolmiea diplomenziesii is a member of the genus Tolmiea. It is found mainly in Oregon and California, but it is endemic to the United States. The plant was formerly considered to be part of T. menziesii but was split off as a separate species because while T. menziesii is tetraploid, T. diplomenziesii is diploid.

References

Saxifragaceae
Flora of the West Coast of the United States
Flora without expected TNC conservation status